Exodus is an American thrash metal band from Richmond, California. Formed in 1979, the group originally included lead vocalist Keith Stewart, guitarists Kirk Hammett and Tim Agnello, and drummer Tom Hunting, who later added guitarist Mikey B, who left after six months. Stewart left later, with Hunting handling lead vocal duties for a short period. Agnello also left shortly after, leaving the band to continue as a trio. Melson was replaced by Jeff Andrews around the same time. Gary Holt joined as Agnello's replacement in 1981. In 1982, the band added vocalist Paul Baloff, who performed on its first three-track demo the same year. The following April, Hammett left Exodus to join Metallica, with Rick Hunolt quickly brought in to replace him. Andrews later left to form death metal band Possessed, and was replaced by Rob McKillop.

With a settled lineup of Hunting, Holt, Baloff, McKillop and Hunolt, Exodus released its debut studio album Bonded by Blood in 1985. Following the touring cycle for the album, Baloff was fired from Exodus due to "personal and musical differences," having contributed to the writing of two tracks for the band's second album. He was replaced by former Legacy singer Steve "Zetro" Souza. After the release of Pleasures of the Flesh and Fabulous Disaster, Hunting left Exodus in 1989 and was replaced by John Tempesta. Impact Is Imminent was released in 1990, and the following year McKillop was replaced by Mike Butler, who performed on the 1992 release Force of Habit. Due to increased tensions between the singer and other members, the band fired Souza after touring throughout 1993, shortly before disbanding.

Holt and Hunolt reunited Exodus in 1997. Hunting and Baloff rejoined also, and Jack Gibson was added as their new bassist, completing a short tour which spawned the live album Another Lesson in Violence. The band returned again in September 2001, before Baloff died on February 4, 2002, after suffering a stroke. Just two days later, it was announced that Exodus would continue its scheduled tour with returning vocalist Souza. The band released its first studio album in twelve years in February 2004, Tempo of the Damned, before Souza left again in September. After Exhumed frontman Matt Harvey initially filled in on vocals, Skinlab singer Steev Esquivel took over for tour dates in October and November, before Rob Dukes was brought in as Souza's official replacement in January 2005.

Further lineup changes took place in 2005 – first Hunting was replaced by Paul Bostaph in May, then Hunolt left in June, with Heathen guitarist Lee Altus taking his place in August. Shovel Headed Kill Machine was released in October, which was Bostaph's only recording with the band as Hunting returned in March 2007. In 2012, Hunolt returned as a touring guitarist in place of Holt, who had begun touring with Slayer in place of Jeff Hanneman. Holt later joined Slayer as an official member, with Heathen's Kragen Lum joining Exodus for tour dates in 2013. In June 2014, Dukes was dismissed from Exodus and replaced by the returning Souza.

Members

Current

Former

Touring

Timeline

Lineups

References

External links 
Exodus official website

Exodus